Trudy was a western lowland gorilla residing in Little Rock, Arkansas, in the United States. She was estimated to have been born in 1956 or 1957 in the wild. Following the death of Colo in January 2017, she was the oldest known living gorilla in the world (together with German gorilla Fatou), reaching 63 years of age. She died the night of 24 July 2019.

References

 

Individual gorillas
1957 animal births
2019 animal deaths